Behind the Evidence is a 1935 American crime film directed by Lambert Hillyer and starring Norman Foster, Sheila Bromley and Donald Cook. It was produced and distributed by Columbia Pictures.

Main cast
 Norman Foster as Tony Sheridan 
 Sheila Bromley as Ruth Allen 
 Donald Cook as Ward Cameron 
 Geneva Mitchell as Rita Sinclair 
 Samuel S. Hinds as J.T. Allen 
 Frank Darien as Herbert 
 Pat O'Malley as Police Lt. James 
 Gordon De Main as Captain Graham 
 Edward Keane as Hackett 
 Lucille Ball as Secretary

References

Bibliography
 Patricia King Hanson. The American Film Institute Catalog of Motion Pictures Produced in the United States: Feature Films, 1931-1940, Volumes 1-3. University of California Press, 1993.

External links
 

1935 films
1935 crime films
American black-and-white films
American crime films
Films directed by Lambert Hillyer
Columbia Pictures films
1930s English-language films
1930s American films